Admiral Sir Thomas Briggs  (1780 – 16 December 1852) was an officer of the British Royal Navy who served during the French Revolutionary and Napoleonic Wars, and went on to be Commander-in-Chief, Portsmouth.

Early life and career
The only surviving son of Dr. Stephen Briggs, Chief Surgeon at Madras, and Magdalene Pasley, Briggs entered the Navy on 10 September 1791. He first served as a first class volunteer aboard the ship , under the command of his uncle Captain Thomas Pasley. He later followed him into the ship  with the rank of midshipman.

Commands 
On 10 July 1799 Briggs was appointed acting-commander of the sloop HMS Salamine, and was officially confirmed in that rank on 30 June 1800, having taken part in the reduction of Genoa earlier. Warren intercepted the French fleet and pursued them back to Toulon. Briggs was then engaged in the expedition to Egypt under Lord Keith and Sir Ralph Abercromby, for which he was awarded the Turkish Gold Medal and the Order of the Crescent, and was promoted to post-captain on 24 July 1801. He commanded , flagship of Sir Richard Bickerton off Alexandria, then  on the Mediterranean and Home stations from 1802.

From 14 December 1805 he was appointed to command of the frigate , and in late 1806 captured two privateers; Guadeloupe of 3 guns and 54 men on 25 September, and Susanna of 4 guns and 20 men on 12 November.

There, on 28 January 1810, he captured the privateer L' Henri, of 8 guns and 57 men, and proved of material service in disembarking the troops at the reduction of the Île de France in December 1810.

On 15 May 1818, Briggs joined , as Flag-Captain to Sir George Campbell, Commander-in-Chief, Portsmouth, serving there until February 1821.

Admiral 

In 1823 Briggs was appointed Resident Commissioner of the Royal Naval Dockyard at Bermuda. He transferred to Malta in 1829, being promoted to Rear-Admiral on 27 June 1832, and was appointed Superintendent of the Malta Dockyard, remaining in that post until 1838. He was awarded the Knight Grand Cross of the Order of St Michael and St George in 1833, for his services while in temporary command of the Mediterranean Squadron, and was promoted to Vice-Admiral on 23 November 1841.

Personal life
In 1814 he married Isabella Harriet Trepand, and had three sons and a daughter. His eldest son, George Campbell Briggs, died while serving in the Navy with the rank of lieutenant. His daughter married Captain George Bohun Martin, RN.

References

|-

1780 births
1852 deaths
Royal Navy personnel of the Napoleonic Wars
Royal Navy admirals
Knights Grand Cross of the Order of St Michael and St George